Nir Welgreen (born 17 December 1976) is a former professional tennis player from Israel.

Biography
Born in 1976, Welgreen began competing in satellite tournaments in the 1992 season. 

His best performances on the ATP Tour were second round appearances at both Long Island in 1996 and Tashkent in 1997. At Tashkent he also made the semi-finals of the doubles in 1998, Vadim Kutsenko.

During his career he took part in several grand slam qualifying draws, including the 1999 Wimbledon Championships.

He won three ITF singles titles, two in Turkey and one in Ireland.

In doubles he had a top 200 ranking and claimed two Challenger titles.

Challenger titles

Doubles: (2)

References

External links
 
 

1976 births
Living people
Israeli male tennis players